New York Cosmos may refer to

 New York Cosmos (1970–1985), a team in the North American Soccer League (then the top-tier soccer league in the United States and Canada)
 New York Cosmos (2010), a team playing since 2020 in the National Independent Soccer Association (a third-tier soccer league in the United States and Canada) that was formed in 2010 and named for the original team
 New York Cosmos B, the B team of the 2010 incarnation of the soccer club
 New York Cosmos Stadium, a proposed stadium for the modern club which was unveiled in January 2013 and abandoned in December 2016.